The 2003 Pittsburgh Panthers football team represented the University of Pittsburgh in the 2003 NCAA Division I-A football season.

Schedule

Coaching staff

Awards and honors
 Larry Fitzgerald: Fred Biletnikoff Award, Walter Camp Award, Unanimous All-American

Team Players drafted into the NFL

References

Pittsburgh
Pittsburgh Panthers football seasons
Pittsburgh Panthers football